Caleb Tochukwu Maranatha Ekwegwo (born 1 August 1988 in Onitsha, Nigeria) is a former Nigerian-born Hong Kong professional footballer who played as a striker.

Club career
In December 2018, after residing in Hong Kong for more than 7 years, Ekwegwo was granted the HKSAR passport, making him eligible to be registered as a local player in Hong Kong.

External links

Caleb Ekwegwo at HKFA

1988 births
Living people
Nigerian footballers
Nigerian expatriate footballers
Hong Kong footballers
Naturalized footballers of Hong Kong
Association football forwards
Hong Kong Premier League players
Hong Kong First Division League players
Liga Leumit players
Israeli Premier League players
A Lyga players
Sun Hei SC players
Hong Kong Rangers FC players
Hapoel Nof HaGalil F.C. players
FK Banga Gargždai players
Tai Po FC players
Yuen Long FC players
Expatriate footballers in Hong Kong
Expatriate footballers in Israel
Expatriate footballers in Lithuania
Nigerian expatriate sportspeople in Hong Kong
Nigerian expatriate sportspeople in Israel
Nigerian expatriate sportspeople in Lithuania
Sportspeople from Onitsha